Joseph Owens (born 1878) was a Welsh footballer who played as a forward for Rhosllanerchrugog, Wrexham and Wales.

International appearances

References

Welsh footballers
Association football forwards
Wrexham A.F.C. players
Wales international footballers
1878 births
Year of death missing
Rhosllanerchrugog F.C. players